Kunchacko Boban is an Indian actor, producer and businessman who works in Malayalam films and has acted in more than 90 films over the period of more than two decades and has received several awards including the Kerala State Film Awards.
He started acting at the age of 5 in the Fazil directed drama Dhanya as a child artist in a small role and it was produced by his father Boban Kunchacko. He debuted as an adult leading role in Fazil's 1997 romantic drama Aniyathipravu which became the one of the highest-grossing Malayalam film of the year, establishing him as a bankable actor in the industry.

In 2016, Kunchacko produced the comedy drama film Kochauvva Paulo Ayyappa Coelho through Udaya Studios, in the process of reviving the studio after a 30-year hiatus.

Kunchacko has announced the movie Ariyippu under the banner of Udaya Studios at the occasion of his Silver Jubilee celebration as hero and Platinum Jubilee celebration of Udaya Pictures.

Film

All films are in Malayalam language unless otherwise noted.

References

Kunchacko Boban plays as double  role and triple role films.

Boban, Kunchacko